The Stadion Miejski Widzewa Łódź (Widzew Łódź Municipal Stadium), also known as Stadion Widzewa (Widzew Stadium), is a football stadium in Łódź, Poland.  It is the home stadium of Widzew Łódź.  The stadium has an all-seater capacity of about 18,000.
The previous stadium has a capacity of 10,500 seats, with only part of the West Stand covered. It was demolished in early 2015 to make way for the new stadium.

Redevelopment 2015

After many proposals over the years and speculation about a replacement for Widzew Stadium (including for UEFA Euro 2012), a definitive redevelopment was started in 2014. Until the stadium was completed Widzew played their home games at Piotrków Trybunalski.

In October 2014 plans for a new 18,018 seater stadium were announced. It is intended the stadium was completed by November 2016. The main contractor is Lodz Mosty. Lodz Mosty had until 24 January 2015 to present a finalised stadium design. Unlike previous proposals all seats are covered. The exterior is clad in red-brick and transparent back-lit panels. The West Grandstand continues to be the main stand. It contains the changing rooms, gym, 24 corporate boxes, 8 commentary boxes, 2 TV studios etc. The other 3 stands have simpler facilities, and include space for 900-1200 visiting supporters. The pitch was moved 20m to the east to accommodate the larger West Stand, encroaching on the current training pitch. 

Local roads and tram-lines were also upgraded.

The stadium was also designed to accommodate Rugby, including local club Budowlani S.A., and concerts. The North stand was designed to incorporate a stage.

This stadium hosted the opening and final of the 2019 FIFA U-20 World Cup, as a part of the six host cities in Poland.

References

Sources
  Stadion Widzewa Łódź
 Lodzpost.com: Home is where the heart is - last game at the old stadium

See also 
 Stadion Miejski im. Władysława Króla

Łódź
Sport in Łódź
Buildings and structures in Łódź
Sports venues in Łódź Voivodeship